In Greek mythology, Imbrius (Ancient Greek: Ἵμβριος "native of Imbros"), son of Mentor (who was rich in horse), was a defender of Troy. According to the Iliad, Imbrius originated from Pedaeum (Pedaeus) and was married to Medesicaste, an illegitimate daughter of King Priam. When the Greeks landed at Troy, Imbrius moved to the house of his father-in-law, who treated him like his own son. Imbrius fought at the walls of Troy and was killed by Teucer.

Imbrius also occurs as a surname of Eetion.

Notes

References 

 Homer, The Iliad with an English Translation by A.T. Murray, Ph.D. in two volumes. Cambridge, MA., Harvard University Press; London, William Heinemann, Ltd. 1924. . Online version at the Perseus Digital Library.
 Homer, Homeri Opera in five volumes. Oxford, Oxford University Press. 1920. . Greek text available at the Perseus Digital Library.
 Pausanias, Description of Greece with an English Translation by W.H.S. Jones, Litt.D., and H.A. Ormerod, M.A., in 4 Volumes. Cambridge, MA, Harvard University Press; London, William Heinemann Ltd. 1918. . Online version at the Perseus Digital Library
 Pausanias, Graeciae Descriptio. 3 vols. Leipzig, Teubner. 1903.  Greek text available at the Perseus Digital Library.

Trojans